Stirling Square Capital Partners is a London-based private equity firm that invests in companies across Europe valued at €50-500 million.

Stirling Square was founded in 2002, and has "total committed capital in excess of €1 billion".

Stirling Square are based in Duke of York's Square, Chelsea, London.

The co-founding partners of the firm are Stefano Bonfiglio and Gregorio Napoleone.

Portfolio
 Siblu

References

External links

Financial services companies established in 2002
Financial services companies based in London
Private equity firms of the United Kingdom
Companies based in the City of Westminster